The 1919–20 NHL season was the third season of the National Hockey League (NHL). A Quebec team was activated by the NHL, increasing the number of teams to four. The four teams played 24 games in a split-schedule format. The Ottawa Senators won the league championship by winning both halves of the split-season. The Senators went on to win the Stanley Cup for the first time since the Cup challenge era ended and their eighth time overall, by defeating the PCHA's Seattle Metropolitans three games to two in a best-of-five series in the Stanley Cup Finals.

League business 

The NHL approved the name change of Toronto's franchise to Tecumsehs on December 6, 1919, a previous name of a Toronto franchise in the NHA. Several days later the franchise was transferred from the Arena to private investors, which named the club the Toronto St. Patricks. The group paid $5,000 to the NHL for the franchise.

Since the NHL had cancelled the previous Quebec franchise after Percy Quinn tried to use the franchise to resurrect the NHA, Quebec was without a franchise. By agreement with the NHL franchise's previous owners, a new Quebec franchise was approved on December 16, 1919. Quebec, which did not ice teams in the first two seasons of the NHL, finally iced a team, although they were not successful.

Regular season

Highlights 
The Montreal Canadiens had their home opener January 10 in brand new Mount Royal Arena and Newsy Lalonde used the occasion to celebrate with six goals in a 14–7 drubbing of the Toronto St. Patricks. The combined total of 21 goals by both teams set the NHL record.

Jack Darragh of Ottawa had a chance to play in goal when Toronto defeated Ottawa 5–3 on January 24. He took over when Clint Benedict was penalized. He did not surrender any goals during the two minutes.

Despite a dismal record of 2–10 in both halves of the season, the Quebec Athletics' Joe Malone scored seven goals in one game on January 31, 1920. , it is still the NHL record for most goals in one game. An eighth goal was disallowed on an off-side call. Malone was later quoted "the thing I recall most vividly is that it was bitterly cold." He nearly equalled the record on March 10 when he scored six goals in a 10–4 win over the Ottawa Senators. Malone led the league in goals with 39. But by surrendering 7.18 goals against per game, a record that stands today, Quebec finished dead last.

With the war now over, players came home and fans were now coming in larger numbers to see games. On February 21, 1920, a record crowd of 8,500 fans came to see Ottawa play Toronto at the Arena Gardens.

Final standings

Playoffs 

Because the Ottawa Senators won both halves of the split regular season, there was no need for an NHL playoff. The Senators were named NHL champions and given a spot in the Stanley Cup championship series. Representing the Pacific Coast Hockey Association (PCHA) was the Seattle Metropolitans, which battled in a tight PCHA, in which two wins separated its three teams. A problem arose as Seattle's green, red, and white uniforms looked similar to Ottawa's black, red, and white uniforms. The Senators agreed to play in white sweaters. The five-game series was scheduled to be played in Ottawa, but unseasonably warm weather forced the final two games to Toronto's Arena Gardens.

Stanley Cup Finals 

Games one, three and five were played under NHL rules (without a rover), while games two and four were played under PCHA rules (with a rover).

Awards 
 NHL champion – Ottawa Senators

Note:
The O'Brien Cup, still considered the championship of the NHA, was not actually awarded in 1920. It remained under the care of the Canadiens who had won it in 1917, until the death of their owner, George Kennedy in 1921, when the NHL made arrangements to re-use the trophy. The Hockey Hall of Fame lists Ottawa as the winner for 1919–20.

Player statistics

Scoring leaders 
GP = Games Played, G = Goals, A = Assists, Pts = Points, PIM = Penalties In Minutes

Source: NHL.

Leading goaltenders 
GP = Games Played, Mins = Minutes played, GA = Goals Against, SO = Shutouts, GAA = Goals Against Average

Source: NHL

Coaches 
 Montreal Canadiens: Newsy Lalonde
 Ottawa Senators: Pete Green
 Quebec Athletics: Mike Quinn
 Toronto St. Patricks: Frank Carroll

Milestones and records 
 January 31 – Quebec Athletics' Joe Malone scores seven goals in one game (record for most goals in one game by a player)
 March 3 – Montreal Canadiens defeat Quebec Athletics 16–3 (record for most goals by one team)

Debuts 
The following is a list of players of note who played their first NHL game in 1919–20 (listed with their first team, asterisk(*) marks debut in playoffs):

The last remaining active player to kick off their NHL career this season was Jake Forbes, who played his final NHL game in the 1932–33 season, although he missed the 1921–22 season.

Last games 
The following is a list of players of note that played their last game in the NHL in 1919–20 (listed with their last team):

See also 
 List of Stanley Cup champions
 1919–20 NHL Transactions
 List of pre-NHL seasons
 1919–20 PCHA season

References 
 
 
 
 
 
 
 

Notes

 
National Hockey League transactions
NHL